Fat City Cycles was an American bicycle manufacturing company. Fat City was started by Chris Chance in 1982. Fat City Cycles was one of the early builders of mountain bikes on the East Coast of the United States. When Fat City moved from Somerville, Massachusetts to South Glens Falls, New York, many of the employees left behind went on to start Independent Fabrication.

History of Fat City Cycles
Chris Chance began building frames in 1977. The company was financed, amongst others, by his wife Wendyll's family. Chance built his first mountain bike frame in 1982, The Fat Chance.

Fat City Cycles closed its doors in Somerville in October 1994 when it was sold to a holding company that had acquired another bike company (Serotta) in South Glens Falls, New York. The holding company moved the Fat City equipment to South Glens Falls. Few employees remained with the company after the move.

Models
Below is a list of some of Fat City Cycles' bicycles.

References

Cycle manufacturers of the United States
Defunct companies based in Massachusetts
Mountain bike manufacturers
1982 establishments in Massachusetts
1999 disestablishments in New York (state)
Manufacturing companies established in 1982
Manufacturing companies disestablished in 1999
1994 mergers and acquisitions